Yevheniya Tovstohan (born April 3, 1965) is a Ukrainian former handball player who competed for the Soviet Union in the 1988 Summer Olympics.

In 1988 she won the bronze medal with the Soviet team. She played four matches and scored ten goals.

Biography
Yevheniya Tovstohan

External links
 Yevheniya Tovstohan — Olympic sports statistics on sports-reference.com

1965 births
Living people
Soviet female handball players
Ukrainian female handball players
Olympic handball players of the Soviet Union
Handball players at the 1988 Summer Olympics
Olympic bronze medalists for the Soviet Union
Olympic medalists in handball
Medalists at the 1988 Summer Olympics